The Philippine long-fingered bat (Miniopterus paululus) is a species of bat from the family Miniopteridae. It is native to Indonesia, the Philippines, Malaysia, and Timor-Leste. Due to the dubious taxonomic status of the species, it has been suggested that it remain classified as a subspecies of the little bent-wing bat.

References 

Mammals described in 1913
Miniopteridae
Mammals of the Philippines
Taxa named by Ned Hollister
Bats of Southeast Asia